Portrait of Johannes Wtenbogaert is a 1633 oil on canvas portrait by Rembrandt of the Remonstrant preacher and writer Johannes Wtenbogaert, now in the Rijksmuseum.

Sources
http://hdl.handle.net/10934/RM0001.COLLECT.50214
http://www.verenigingrembrandt.nl/152/de-kunst/gesteunde-kunst/portret-van-johannes-wtenbogaert-1557-1644-remonstrants-predikant-op-76-jarige-leeftijd/?id=10075

Paintings in the collection of the Rijksmuseum
1633 paintings
Wtenbogaert, Johannes
Wtenbogaert, Johannes
Wtenbogaert, Johannes